Bannoye, or Yaktykul (Yaqtıkül), is the name of a lake in the Republics of Bashkortostan in Russia, and a famous ski resort near it. With a depth of 28 m Lake Bannoye is one of the deepest lakes not only in Bashkortostan, but also in Russia.

The lake and its surroundings are favorite vacation spot. Around the lake are motels and resorts, there is a ski resort on the mountain Bashmak.

Since 1965, it is a natural monument.

Etymology
The Russian name "Bannoye" means "washing", "bathing". A legend has it, that Yemelyan Pugachev's retinue rested by the lake for bathing. The Bashkir name "Yaktykul" means "clear", referring to its clarity.

References

External links

 A page about MMK ski resorts in English

Lakes of Bashkortostan
Tourist attractions in the Soviet Union